Cherokee Bryan Parks (born October 11, 1972) is an American former professional basketball player. He played nine seasons in the National Basketball Association (NBA).

A 6 ft 11 in (211 cm), 240 lb (109 kg) center, Parks played college basketball at Duke University under coach Mike Krzyzewski and won the 1992 national title during his freshman year. After college, he was selected by the Dallas Mavericks in the 1st round (12th overall pick) of the 1995 NBA Draft. In his nine-season NBA career (1995–2004), he played for the Mavericks, Minnesota Timberwolves, Vancouver Grizzlies, Los Angeles Clippers, San Antonio Spurs, Washington Wizards, and Golden State Warriors. He averaged career-highs of 7.1 points and 5.5 rebounds per game during the 1997–98 season with Minnesota. Parks came out of retirement in 2011 to play in France.

Currently, Parks is a team liaison for the New Orleans Pelicans.

In an interview with Sports Illustrated, Parks said that his mother named him "Cherokee" because in 1972, when she was pregnant, "she learned that her husband's great-grandmother had been a full-blooded Cherokee." Parks stated, "It was serious stuff...I was politically active then, and the name was a tribute."  His sister was the original bass player for the band Nashville Pussy.

References

External links
TheDraftReview.com - Parks's NBA Draft History

1972 births
Living people
American expatriate basketball people in Canada
American expatriate basketball people in France
American men's basketball players
American people who self-identify as being of Native American descent
Basketball players from California
Competitors at the 1994 Goodwill Games
Dallas Mavericks draft picks
Dallas Mavericks players
Duke Blue Devils men's basketball players
Golden State Warriors players
Goodwill Games medalists in basketball
Los Angeles Clippers players
McDonald's High School All-Americans
Minnesota Timberwolves players
Parade High School All-Americans (boys' basketball)
Power forwards (basketball)
San Antonio Spurs players
Sportspeople from Huntington Beach, California
Vancouver Grizzlies players